Khalatabad (also Romanized as Khal‘atābād) is a village in Sabzdasht Rural District, in the Central District of Kabudarahang County, Hamadan Province, Iran. At the 2006 census, its population was 977, in 200 families.

References 

Populated places in Kabudarahang County